Rhytiphora frenchi is a species of beetle in the family Cerambycidae. It was described by Thomas Blackburn in 1890, originally under the genus Symphyletes. It is known from Australia.

References

frenchi
Beetles described in 1890
Taxa named by Thomas Blackburn (entomologist)